Sherlock Bristol (5 June 1815 – 26 September 1906) was a congregational clergyman.

References

American Congregationalist ministers
1815 births
1906 deaths
19th-century American clergy